Tyge Ahrengot Christensen (31 March 1918 in Nykøbing Mors – 17 January 1996) was a Danish botanist and phycologist.

References

1918 births
1996 deaths
20th-century Danish botanists
Danish phycologists
People from Morsø Municipality